Iván Maldonado Oquendo (born June 7, 1980) is a Puerto Rican-American baseball pitcher who is free agent.

Career
Maldonado was drafted by the New York Mets in the 18th round of the 2002 MLB draft.

Maldonado was signed by the Long Island Ducks, an independent team on April 9, 2010.

After the 2020 season, he played for Criollos de Caguas of the Liga de Béisbol Profesional Roberto Clemente(LBPRC). He has also played for Puerto Rico in the 2021 Caribbean Series.

International career
He also was a member of the Puerto Rico team in the 2006 World Baseball Classic, 2009 World Baseball Classic, 2018 Central American and Caribbean Games and 2019 Pan American Games.

References

External links

MILB Player Bio

1980 births
Living people
American expatriate baseball players in Mexico
American sportspeople of Puerto Rican descent
Acereros de Monclova players
Baseball players at the 2019 Pan American Games
Binghamton Mets players
Broncos de Reynosa players
Brooklyn Cyclones players
Cangrejeros de Santurce (baseball) players
Capital City Bombers players
Central American and Caribbean Games gold medalists for Puerto Rico
Central American and Caribbean Games medalists in baseball
Competitors at the 2018 Central American and Caribbean Games
Criollos de Caguas players
Diablos Rojos del México players
Gigantes de Carolina players
Gulf Coast Mets players
Indios de Mayagüez players
Indian Hills Falcons baseball players
Indian River State College alumni
Kingsport Mets players
Liga de Béisbol Profesional Roberto Clemente pitchers
Long Island Ducks players
Medalists at the 2019 Pan American Games
Mexican League baseball pitchers
National baseball team players
Navegantes del Magallanes players
American expatriate baseball players in Venezuela
New Orleans Zephyrs players
Pan American Games gold medalists for Puerto Rico
Pan American Games medalists in baseball
People from Cayey, Puerto Rico
Baseball players from New York City
St. Lucie Mets players
Tigres de Quintana Roo players
2006 World Baseball Classic players
2009 World Baseball Classic players